Web Service Atomic Transaction is an OASIS standard. 
To achieve all-or-nothing property for a group of services, it defines three protocols (completion, volatile two-phase commit, and durable two-phase commit), and a set of services. These protocols and services together ensure automatic activation, registration, propagation and atomic termination of web services. The protocols are implemented via the WS-Coordination context management framework and emulate ACID transaction properties.

Following the standard, a distributed transaction has a coordinator, an initiator, and one or more participants.

See also
 WS-BPEL
 WS-CDL
 Web Service
 WS-Coordination

External links
 Web Services Atomic Transaction Version 1.1
 Web Services Atomic Transaction Version 1.2

Computer standards
Open standards